Demographic economics or population economics is the application of economic analysis to demography, the study of human populations, including size, growth, density, distribution, and vital statistics.

Aspects
Aspects of the subject include
 marriage and fertility
 the family 
 divorce 
 morbidity and life expectancy/mortality 
 dependency ratios 
 migration 
 population growth
 population size 
 public policy 
 the demographic transition from "population explosion" to (dynamic) stability or decline.

Other subfields include measuring value of life and the economics of the elderly and the handicapped and of gender, race, minorities, and non-labor discrimination.  In coverage and subfields, it complements labor economics and  implicates a variety of other economics subjects. 

Subareas 
The Journal of Economic Literature classification codes are a way of categorizing subjects in economics. There, demographic economics is paired with labour economics as one of 19 primary classifications at JEL: J. It has eight subareas:
 General
 Demographic Trends and Forecasts
 Marriage; Marital Dissolution; Family Structure
 Fertility; Family Planning; Child Care; Children; Youth
 Economics of the Elderly; Economics of the Handicapped
 Economics of Minorities and Races; Non-labor Discrimination
 Economics of Gender; Non-labor Discrimination
 Value of life; Foregone Income
 Public Policy

See also

 Cost of raising a child
 Family economics
 Generational accounting
 Growth economics

Related:

 Income and fertility
 Demographic dividend
 Demographic transition
 Demographic gift
 Demographic window
 Demographic trap
 Preston curve
 Development economics

Notes

References
 John Eatwell, Murray Milgate, and Peter Newman, ed. ([1987] 1989. Social Economics: The New Palgrave,  pp.  v-vi. Arrow-page searchable links to entries for:
 "Ageing Populations," pp. 1-3,  by Robert L. Clark
 "Declining Population," pp.  10-15, by Robin Barlow
 "Demographic Transition," pp.  16-23, by Ansley J. Coale
 "Extended Family," pp. 58-63, by Oliva Harris
 "Family," pp.  65-76, by Gary S. Becker
 "Fertility," pp.77-89, by Richard A. Easterlin
 "Gender," pp. 95-108, by Francine D. Blau
 "Race and Economics," pp. 215-218, by H. Stanback
 "Value of Life," pp.289-76, by Thomas C. Schelling
 Nathan Keyfitz, 1987.  "demography," The New Palgrave: A Dictionary of Economics, v. 1, pp. 796–802.
 T. Paul Schultz, 1981. Economics of Population. Addison-Wesley. Book review.
 John B. Shoven, ed., 2011. Demography and the Economy, University of Chicago Press. Scroll-down description and preview.
 Julian L. Simon, 1977. The Economics of Population Growth.  Princeton,
 _, [1981] 1996. The Ultimate Resource 2, rev. and expanded.  Princeton.  Description and preview links.
Dennis A. Ahlburg,  1998. "Julian Simon and the Population Growth Debate," Population and Development Review, 24(2), pp. 317-327.
 M. Perlman, 1982. [Untitled review of Simon, 1977 & 1981], Population Studies, 36(3), pp. 490-494.
 Julian L. Simon, ed., 1997. The Economics Of Population: Key Modern Writings. Description.
 _, ed., 1998. The Economics of Population: Classic Writings.  Description and scroll to chapter-preview links.
 Joseph J. Spengler 1951. "The Population Obstacle to Economic Betterment," American Economic Review, 41(2), pp. 343-354.
 _, 1966. "The Economist and the Population Question," American Economic Review, 56(1/2), pp. 1–24.

Journals
 Demography – Scope and links to issue contents & abstracts.
 Journal of Population Economics –  Aims and scope and 20th Anniversary statement, 2006.
 Population and Development Review –  Aims and abstract & supplement links.
 Population Bulletin – Each issue on a   current population topic.
 Population Studies  —Aims and scope.
 Review of Economics of the Household